Andres Särev (8 February 1902 Paistu, Heimtali Parish – 18 March 1970 Tallinn) was an Estonian director and actor.

1922–1926 he worked at Ugala Theatre, 1926–1928 in Endla Theatre, 1928–1930 in Pärnu Töölisteater, 1930–1940 in Tallinn Töölisteater, 1939–1949 in Estonia Theatre (whereas 1942–1944 its head), 1949–1968 in Estonian Drama Theatre. Besides theatre roles she has played also in several films.

Awards
 1947: Meritorious Artist of the Estonian SSR

Legacy
In Tallinn there is located a memorial museum dedicated to Andres Särev. The museum belongs to Estonian Theatre and Music Museum.

Filmography

 1947: "Elu tsitadellis"
 1957: "Juunikuu päevad"
 1962: "Jääminek"
 1965: "Me olime 18-aastased"
 1967: "Viini postmark"

References

External links 

 

1902 births
1970 deaths
Estonian male stage actors
Estonian male film actors
Estonian male television actors
Estonian male radio actors
20th-century Estonian male actors
Estonian theatre directors
People from Viljandi Parish